King Biscuit Flower Hour Presents Greg Lake In Concert is a live album of the Greg Lake Band recorded in concert November 5, 1981, at the Hammersmith Odeon in London, England, that was broadcast live on the King Biscuit Flower Hour radio program, first released on CD in 1995.

The Greg Lake Band were Greg Lake (guitar, lead vocals) featuring Gary Moore (lead guitar, vocals), Tommy Eyre (keyboards, vocals), Tris Margetts (bass, vocals), and Ted McKenna (drums, vocals).

The set list included songs from the band's first album Greg Lake and Greg's King Crimson composition "21st Century Schizoid Man" as well as a mix of ELP's "Fanfare For The Common Man" and "Karn Evil 9"; Greg's ELP song "Lucky Man", and Gary Moore's "Parisienne Walkways".

The recording has been released multiple times with various titles (including London '81), sometimes featuring songs recorded at other concerts during the band's 1981 tour of the UK, U.S. and Canada, and some releases include Greg's King Crimson song "In The Court Of The Crimson King" and other selections such as Greg's Emerson, Lake & Palmer song "C'est la Vie".

The recording was mastered at PolyGram Studios. The CD was mastered at Dolphin Studios.

Track listing

Personnel
Greg Lake Band
 Greg Lake – lead vocals, guitar
 Gary Moore – lead guitar, vocals
 Tommy Eyre – keyboards, vocals
 Ted McKenna – drums, percussion
 Tristram Margetts – bass

References

Greg Lake albums
1981 live albums
Albums recorded at the Hammersmith Apollo